Udea fulvalis is a species of moth of the family Crambidae. It was first described by Jacob Hübner in 1809.

Etymology
The species name fulvalis derives from the Latin fulvus, meaning fulvous.

Distribution
This species can be found in most of Europe.

Description
Udea fulvalis has a wingspan measuring between 24 and 29 mm.  The uppersides of the forewings of these moths show a fulvous brown or yellowish-brown colouration, with darker markings. Larvae are pale green, with a black head.

Adults of this species are rather similar to Ebulea crocealis and Udea prunalis.

Biology
Adults are on wing in one generation a year (univoltine species) from June to late August, depending on location. They preferably fly at night, when they come to light. 

The larvae mainly feed on a variety of plants of the family Lamiaceae (Ballota, Nepeta and Salvia pratensis, etc.), but also on Cornus and Lychnis. They pupate in a cocoon amongst leaves of the host plants.

References

External links
 Lepiforum.de 
 Udea fulvalis at Funet
 Naturhistoriska risksmuseet 
 Paolo Mazzei, Daniel Morel, Raniero Panfil Moths and Butterflies of Europe and North Africa

fulvalis
Moths of Europe
Moths of Asia
Moths described in 1809